Elio Guarisco (August 5, 1954 - November 27, 2020) was an Italian writer, translator and Tibetan Buddhist scholar and Dzogchen practitioner, member of the International Dzogchen Community.

Life 
Guarisco was born in Varese, Italy. After spending his formative years in Como, he went on to study art and receive a Master of Arts before traveling to India to study Buddhism.

In the early 1970s, he studied under the auspices of several Theravada leaders in India including Satya Narayan Goenka. He later studied Buddhist philosophy in a Tibetan monastery in Switzerland for ten years, after which he was invited by Kalu Rinpoche to work as a translator in Sonada, India and where he stayed for twenty years. In the meantime he had met in Italy his teacher Chögyal Namkhai Norbu, becoming an active member of the Dzogchen community in 1986.

He served as a coordinator of the Ka-ter Translation Project, as well as instructor of the Santi Maha Sangha program. He was a founding member of the Shang Shung Institute in Italy. During the last years of his life, he also taught the application of meditation to daily life to any who were interested. He taught meditation and contemplation all over the world: including Europe, Russia, China, Australia, the US, Mexico and Latin America.

Elio Guarisco died in November 2020 of a COVID-19 infection in Como, Italy.

Translations 
The Treasury of Knowledge: Book Six, Part Four (2005)
The Treasury of Knowledge: Book Eight, Part Three (2008)
Healing with Fire: A Practical Manual of Tibetan Moxibustion (2011)
Longchenpa's Advice from the Heart (2011)
Togden Shakya Shri: The Life and Liberation of a Tibetan Yogin (2012)
Creative Vision and Inner Reality by Jamgon Kongtrul Lodrö Thaye (2012)
The Tibetan Book of the Dead: Awakening Upon Dying (2013)
The Marvelous Primordial State. The Mejung Tantra. A Fundamental Scripture of Dzogchen Semde - together with Adriano Clemente and Jim Valby (2013)
The Secret Map Of The Body: Visions Of The Human Energy Structure by Gyalwa Yangönpa (2015)
The Life and Teaching of A Tibetan Master (in Italian)
The Autobiography of the 84 Tantric Masters of India (in Italian)
The Lifestory of Kunga Lekpa (in Italian)
Myriad Worlds
Buddhist Ethics
The Indestructibe Way
The Lifestory of Shakya Shri
Three volumes on Tibetan Medicine:
The Silver Mirror
Tibetan Medicine Applied in an Easy Way
Universal Benefit, the Practice of Kunye the Tibetan Massage.
Other works:
When the Garuda Flew to the West (autobiography)
Healing with Yantra Yoga. From Tibetan Medicine to the Subtle Body - together with Puntsog Wangmo (2016)

External links 
Elio Guarisco Blog
Elio Guarisco Facebook page
Elio Guarisco Goodreads bio
Elio Guarisco Shang Shung Institute bio

References 

Tibetan–English translators
1954 births
2020 deaths
People from Como
People from Varese
Tibetan Buddhists
Italian scholars of Buddhism
Tibetan Buddhist spiritual teachers
Tibetologists